Ansten Samuelstuen (May 7, 1929 – August 18, 2012) was an American ski jumper who competed in the early 1960s.

Ansten Samuelstuen was born in Brøttum parish, in Ringsaker, Hedmark, Norway. After immigrating to the U.S. in 1954, he won three national titles in ski jumping, (1957, 1961 and 1962) and held four North American titles (1954, 1955, 1957 and 1964). He became a U.S. citizen in 1957.

Samuelstuen finished seventh in the individual large hill event at the 1960 Winter Olympics in Squaw Valley. His best career finish was 34th in an individual normal hill event in West Germany in 1963. He also competed in the 1964 Winter Olympics.

Death
Samuelstuen died on August 18, 2012, aged 83 in Greeley, Colorado, U.S..

Legacy
In 2009, he was entered into the National Ski Hall of Fame of the United States.

References

External links

 

1929 births
2012 deaths
People from Ringsaker
Norwegian emigrants to the United States
American male ski jumpers
Ski jumpers at the 1960 Winter Olympics
Ski jumpers at the 1964 Winter Olympics